Pentress is a census-designated place (CDP) in northern Monongalia County, West Virginia, United States.  It lies along West Virginia Route 7 northwest of the city of Morgantown, the county seat of Monongalia County.  Its elevation is 951 feet (290 m).  "Pentress" is not the only name the community has had; at various times in its history, it has been known as Minors Mills, New Brownsville, Pentrees, Pentress Junction, Statler Town, Statlers Town, Statlersville, and Stradlerstown. The present name of Pentress was selected by an early settler who reportedly wanted a Welsh name.  It has a post office with the ZIP Code of 26544. As of the 2010 census, its population was 175.

References

Census-designated places in Monongalia County, West Virginia
Census-designated places in West Virginia